The 2021 Mexican Open (also known as the Abierto Mexicano Telcel presentado por HSBC for sponsorship reasons) was a professional tennis tournament played on outdoor hard courts. It was the 28th edition of the men's Mexican Open, and part of the 2021 ATP Tour.  It took place in Acapulco, Mexico between 15 and 20 March 2021, at the Princess Mundo Imperial.

Champions

Singles

  Alexander Zverev def.  Stefanos Tsitsipas, 6–4, 7–6(7–3)

Doubles

  Ken Skupski /  Neal Skupski def.  Marcel Granollers /  Horacio Zeballos, 7–6(7–3), 6–4

Singles main-draw entrants

Seeds

1 Rankings as of March 8, 2021.

Other entrants 
The following players received wildcards into the main draw:
  Carlos Alcaraz
  Sebastian Korda 
  Gerardo López Villaseñor

The following player received entry using a protected ranking into the singles main draw:
  Kevin Anderson

The following player received special exemption into the singles main draw:
  Daniel Elahi Galán

The following players received entry from the qualifying draw:
  Tallon Griekspoor
  Stefan Kozlov
  Brandon Nakashima
  Lorenzo Musetti

The following player received entry as a lucky loser:
  Denis Kudla

Withdrawals
Before the tournament
  Kevin Anderson → replaced by  Denis Kudla
  Pablo Andújar → replaced by  Steve Johnson
  Cristian Garín → replaced by  Salvatore Caruso
  Guido Pella → replaced by  Cameron Norrie
  Sam Querrey → replaced by  Feliciano López
During the tournament
  Casper Ruud

Retirements
  Adrian Mannarino

Doubles main-draw entrants

Seeds 

1 Rankings as of March 8, 2021.

Other entrants 
The following pairs received wildcards into the doubles main draw:
  Marcelo Demoliner /  Santiago González
  Alexander Zverev /  Mischa Zverev

The following pair received entry from the qualifying draw:
  Luke Saville /  John-Patrick Smith

The following pair received entry as lucky losers:
  Dominik Koepfer /  Artem Sitak

Withdrawals 
  Félix Auger-Aliassime /  Milos Raonic →  Dominik Koepfer /  Artem Sitak

References

External links
 

 
Abierto Mexicano Telcel
Abierto Mexicano Telcel
Mexican Open (tennis)
Abierto Mexicano Telcel